The following divisions from British Crown Colonies served in World War II:

Divisions of the British Army 
 1st African Division
 2nd African Division
 11th African Division
 12th African Division
 81st West African Division
 82nd West African Division

Divisions of the Indian Army 
(Excluding units from the Indian Empire, which was technically not a Crown Colony.)
1st Burma Division

See also
 Arab Legion
 British Solomon Islands Protectorate Defence Force
 Fiji Infantry Regiment
 List of Indian divisions in World War II
 Royal Hong Kong Regiment
 Royal Malay Regiment

Resources
 British, Commonwealth, and Empire Orders of Battle on 3 September 1939

Notes

Infantry Divisions (British Army and British Indian Army) 1930 - 1956
 British Army formations

Divisions of World War II
Lists of military units and formations of World War II